The Lebanese people of Sweden are people from Lebanon or those of Lebanese descent who live in the country of Sweden. The majority of Lebanese people emigrated to Sweden in the period between 1970s and 1980s, either escaping the Lebanese Civil War or for economic reasons. In 2016, there were 148 registered emigrations from Sweden to Lebanon.

The Lebanese people in Sweden have set up their own traditional cultural and political organizations, including the Swedish Lebanese Friendship Association (SLFA). There is a Lebanese embassy in Stockholm.

Most Lebanese in Sweden belong to various Christian denominations (Maronite, Greek Orthodox, Melkite Catholic, Protestant), but there is also a sizable number of Muslims (Sunni and Shi'a) and also some Druze.

Notable people
See List of Lebanese people in Sweden

See also

Arabs in Sweden
Asian immigrants to Sweden
Lebanese people in Denmark
Immigration to Sweden

References

External links
 Lebanese Embassy in Stockholm, Sweden
 Swedish Lebanese Friendship Association official website

Arabs in Sweden
Sweden
Middle Eastern diaspora in Sweden
Swedish people of Lebanese descent